Joyce Peak is a peak rising to over  in the northern central part of Ross Island, Antarctica. It was named by the Advisory Committee on Antarctic Names (2000) after Karen Joyce, a long-term Antarctic Support Associates employee, who from 1990 made 22 deployments to McMurdo Station, including a winter-over, and assisted with computers in the Crary Science and Engineering Center.

References

Mountains of Ross Island